The Teachers on Summer Vacation (Swedish:Magistrarna på sommarlov) is a Swedish film which was released to cinemas in Sweden on 22 November 1941, directed by Schamyl Bauman and starring Alice Babs.

Cast 
Alice Babs
Karl-Arne Holmsten
Thor Modéen
Carl Hagman
Viran Rydkvist
John Botvid
Dagmar Ebbesen
Marianne Aminoff
Åke Johansson
Åke Engfeldt
Linnéa Hillberg
Einar Axelsson
Yngve Nyqvist
Inger Sundberg
Birthe Holmberg

Awards and honours 
Schamyl Bauman won a commendation at the 1941 Venice Film Festival for Swing it, magistern! and Teachers on Summer Vacation.

References

External links 

1941 films
Swedish sequel films
Swedish black-and-white films
Films directed by Schamyl Bauman
1940s Swedish-language films
Swedish comedy films
1941 comedy films
1940s Swedish films